The Rangalau Kiulu Phantom is a spirit in Malaysian mythology. She is a being who reputedly roams the jungle of Sabah at night or at dawn in the guise of a little girl, often accompanied by wailing laughter.

Origins
The night of the incident, a little girl and her parents were sleeping in their hammocks. It was obvious how the cobra entered the vicinity, as there was an outlet in the ceiling that was left unclosed after maintenance.

The cobra was able to slither up into the ventilation system, which led to the sleeping area. This let the cobra loose, where it came across three defenseless humans sleeping.

The odd series of events that must have occurred in order to arrive at the conclusion of the snake killing the parents, but the little girl remained unseen which has left many baffled by the incident. Many questions and skepticism arose from this event. Despite extensive searching by the local police force, no traces of the little girl had ever been found.

It soon arose that the little girl survived but lost her sanity. She became known as the ‘Guardian’ of the jungle. However, as locals have been the only source, there is little evidence favoring the claims. Whether the claims are credible or not, after all, no traces of the girl had been found.

Snakes
Vipers and cobras are the most famous of the snakes the 'Guardian' commands, but the banded sea krait or yellow-lipped sea krait (Laticauda colubrine) can kill three adults with one drop of its venom. There is no antivenom. They are commonly found in rivers, rainforests, and tropical coasts.

Sea snakes are occasionally trapped in fishing nets. When an unfortunate fisherman is busy sorting out fish, he might be unknowingly bitten by a sea snake, due to the anesthetic effect of the venom. The poison dissolves muscles, turns urine red, and painfully kills the victim.

First Victim 
Two Australian snake hunters hiking in the Sabah area, specifically the Kiulu Valley near the river, were searching for an exotic and undocumented species of snake when they were allegedly attacked by the Guardian of the jungle, commanding vipers to bite them. The local guides that were with them had specifically warned of the threat of the vipers commanded by the ‘Guardian’ and laid down rules. Foreigners must address the guides as “Brother” or “Sister” as to not reveal their true identity to the ‘Guardian’. One hunter, with a slip of the tongue, yelled out the guide's name when he first saw the brood of vipers approaching. That hunter allegedly died, while the other managed to escape. The hunter’s body was never found and was suspected to be taken away by the snakes. This prompted action from local authorities in a search and rescue effort, but no body was recovered. Two weeks after the incident, the guide whose identity was exposed was found dead with fangs in his wrist.

Possible Prevention
While the ‘Guardian’ of the jungle’s existence is debatable, locals vehemently stick to this folk tale, citing eyewitness accounts and personal experiences. There are many options for warding off snakes, particularly the sea/river snake mentioned previously. It is common knowledge amongst the local indigenous and bushmen of the area that the colour orange is particularly effective in scaring away the reptilian threat. Furthermore, locals claim that the scent of garlic or raw onion is effective in discouraging snakes from approaching certain areas. With multiple studies done in and around the area, it was found that snakes avoid natural strong scents such as garlic and onions.

See also
Malay folklore
Malay ghost myths

References
 Kiulu Kini. Retrieved November 12, 2015, from https://kiulukini.wordpress.com/
 Tanah runtuh punca ribuan penduduk Kiulu putus bekalan elektrik. Retrieved November 12, 2015, from https://sg.news.yahoo.com/tanah-runtuh-punca-ribuan-penduduk-kiulu-putus-bekalan-090907348.html

Sabah
Sabah mythology
Malaysian mythology